In the name of Allah is the translation of the Islamic phrase Bismillah. In the Name of Allah may also refer to:

In the Name of Allah (album), an album by Kamal Uddin
In the Name of Allah (film), initial working title of 2007 American documentary film A Jihad for Love

See also
Basmala
Bismillah (disambiguation)